Vedran Kukoč (born 26 January 1976, in Split) is a Croatian retired football player. He played abroad for Malaysian Super League side Perak. His preferred position was central defence.

Club career
Kukoč previously played for NK Osijek and HNK Šibenik in the Croatian Prva HNL.

Upon his signing for Perak, coach Steve Darby described Kukoč as "a solid player who is good in the air, very intelligent and very experienced". His assured performances confirmed Kukoč's status as a fan favourite. While at Perak, he was affectionately nicknamed Cookie by their fans.

Kukoc requested, and was subsequently granted, a release at the end of the 2007 season as he wanted to get married.

References

External links
 Profile at 1hnl.net
Profile at hnl-statistika.com

1986 births
Living people
Footballers from Split, Croatia
Association football central defenders
Croatian footballers
RNK Split players
NK Primorac 1929 players
HŠK Posušje players
NK Osijek players
HNK Šibenik players
NK Solin players
Perak F.C. players
Croatian Football League players
Premier League of Bosnia and Herzegovina players
Malaysia Super League players
Croatian expatriate footballers
Expatriate footballers in Bosnia and Herzegovina
Croatian expatriate sportspeople in Bosnia and Herzegovina
Expatriate footballers in Malaysia
Croatian expatriate sportspeople in Malaysia